Carrick Hill is a publicly accessible historic property at the foot of the Adelaide Hills, in the suburb of Springfield, in South Australia. It was the Adelaide home of Sir Edward "Bill" Hayward and his wife Ursula (née Barr-Smith), and contains a large collection of drawings, sculptures, antiques and paintings. Completed in 1939 and built in the style of an English manor, it is one of the few period homes in Australia to have survived with its grounds undiminished and most of its original contents intact.

After being bequeathed to the state of South Australia upon Sir Edward's death in 1983, since 1985 it has been managed by the board of the Carrick Hill Trust, a statutory corporation which  reports to the  Department of the Premier and Cabinet.

History
The nearly 40-hectare property was the wedding gift of Ursula's father to the Haywards. After their marriage in 1935 the couple spent a year-long honeymoon in Europe. They bought many of the furnishings for their new home, including an imposing staircase, at the sale of Beaudesert House in Staffordshire, England. Construction of Carrick House began in 1937 and was completed in 1939. During this time Lady Hayward designed the gardens.

The Haywards claimed a number of well-known artists as close friends, and some of their work features in the collection that fills the house. Ursula was an artist in her own right, and her work is also represented.

Carrick Hill was bequeathed to the state on Sir Edward's death in 1983, his wife having predeceased him. The Carrick Hill Trust was established as a statutory body by the Carrick Hill Trust Act (1985), which reported to Arts SA (later Arts South Australia) from 1993 to 2018, when it started reporting directly to the Department of Premier and Cabinet. 

The artist David Dridan, a personal friend of the Haywards, was a member of the Carrick Hill Interim Committee, and founding member of the Carrick Hill Trust.

The Gardens 

Past owner of Carrick Hill Estate, Ursula Hayward modelled the garden surrounding her home on the English country park, using structures such as hedges, lawn terracing and stone paving, clumps of trees, orchards and cutting beds. Originally there were magnificent avenues of cedars and poplars and views from the lawn terraces span to Adelaide and beyond to the coast. A stunning feature, unique in Australian garden design is the pleached pear arbour.

21st century use
The house and grounds are open to the public for most of the year, closing in July for maintenance. An admission charge applies to the house, but not the gardens. Carrick Hill regularly houses themed art exhibitions.

On 13 November 2005, it hosted a reunion picnic for former staff of John Martin's, which was for many years owned by the Hayward family. The event coincided with the opening of a social history exhibition entitled "Johnnies Spirit of a State" and was held on the weekend of the Adelaide Christmas Pageant, which was founded by Sir Edward.

Carrick Hill has hosted exhibitions of works by notable Australian artists, built around the Hayward collection. Previous exhibitions have featured the work of William Dobell, Jeffrey Smart, Robert Hannaford and Adrian Feint.

In 2018, Carrick Hill hosted an exhibition of May Gibbs' illustrations and other artists working with Australian botanical subjects.

Permanent exhibitions

THE BLADE: The Australian Museum of Gardening 
The Carrick Hill Trust has set up static displays in the historic stable buildings on the art of gardening and changes in the past 250 years. The collection of more than a thousand gardening books and tools, was in collaboration with the Australian Garden History Society and shows Australia's love of lawn and how both plant and machine gained such enduring popularity, plus (Old Mole of Armidale, NSW) Richard Bird's donated collection from Australia and the United Kingdom.

Curated by past director, Richard Heathcote, the collection was Highly Commended in the Interpretation Australia National Awards for Excellence of 2021.

Gallery

References

Further information
Postcards: Carrick Hill's French connection
Gardening Australia ABC: Sophie Thompson visit to Carrick Hill
In the Garden with Kim Syrus

External links
 
Interpretation Australia National Awards for Excellence 2021
Old website:
Ursula Hayward
History - includes information about Sir Edward

Houses in Adelaide
Historic house museums in South Australia
Art museums and galleries in South Australia
South Australian Heritage Register
Tools
Museums in Adelaide
Heritage-listed buildings in Australia
Gardening in Australia